Armando Marenzi (born 16 March 1966) is a Croatian professional football manager and former player.

Playing career
Marenzi started his career in hometown club Šibenik, where he played for 25 years, including his youth career. In 1988, he moved to Spartak Subotica where he made his debut in the Yugoslav First League. However during the season's winter break, Marenzi returned to Šibenik playing back then in the Second League all the way until 1992, after which the club became part of the newly formed Croatian Prva HNL. In 1992, he joined France's Ligue 2, playing two years for Avignon, but after went to the Greek second division, signing with Panargiakos during the 1994–95 and 1995–96 seasons. In 1996, Marenzi joined Greek first division club Panserraikos.

At the age of 32, he returned to Šibenik to play in the Prva HNL. In December 2001, Marenzi moved to Zrinjski Mostar. He ended his career at Zrinjski in 2003.

Managerial career

Early career
After finishing his playing career, Marenzi committed himself to a managerial career. He has an UEFA Pro Licence. His big wish is to one day be manager of Šibenik and Zrinjski, one of the clubs in which he played during his career.

Hajduk Split
Marenzi was hired by Hajduk Split in August 2011 to be the manager of the U11 team. In December 2012, he was the manager of the U15 team, then in 2015 of the U19 team, while in 2016, Marenzi became the first-team assistant manager to Hari Vukas.

RNK Split
In April 2018, Marenzi was named as the new manager of Croatian Second League club RNK Split.

Željezničar
On 18 June 2021, Tomislav Ivković became the new manager of Bosnian Premier League club Željezničar, with Marenzi being announced as his assistant.

Borac Banja Luka
In December 2021, Tomislav Ivković left Željezničar and later, in January 2022, became the new sporting director of Borac Banja Luka, while Marenzi also left Željezničar and joined Borac as a coach.

Al-Wasl Dubai
In August 2022, Marenzi became the new manager of the under-17 team of Al Wasl.

References

External links
 
hskzrinjski.ba
Armando Marenzi at 1nhl.net
Armando Marenzi at Strukljeva.net

1963 births
Living people
Sportspeople from Šibenik
Croatian people of Italian descent
Association football midfielders
Yugoslav footballers
Croatian footballers
HNK Šibenik players
FK Spartak Subotica players
AC Avignonnais players
Panargiakos F.C. players
Panserraikos F.C. players
HŠK Zrinjski Mostar players
Yugoslav First League players
Croatian Football League players
Premier League of Bosnia and Herzegovina players
Croatian expatriate footballers
Expatriate footballers in France
Croatian expatriate sportspeople in France
Expatriate footballers in Greece
Croatian expatriate sportspeople in Greece
Expatriate footballers in Bosnia and Herzegovina
Croatian expatriate sportspeople in Bosnia and Herzegovina
Croatian football managers
RNK Split managers
Croatian expatriate sportspeople in the United Arab Emirates